This article is about the particular significance of the year 1964 to Wales and its people.

Incumbents

Secretary of State for Wales – Jim Griffiths (from 17 October)
Archbishop of Wales – Edwin Morris, Bishop of Monmouth
Archdruid of the National Eisteddfod of Wales – Cynan

Events
March – A representative of the National Coal Board writes to Mr DCW Jones, the Merthyr Tydfil Borough and Waterworks engineer, stating that they "would not like to continue beyond the next 6/8 weeks in tipping" coal slurry on Tip No 7 at Aberfan "where it is likely to be a source of danger to Pantglas school". Two and a half years later the tip would destroy the school, killing 116 children.
15 March – Richard Burton marries Elizabeth Taylor (for the first time) in Montreal.
April – George Street Bridge, Newport opens, the first cable-stayed bridge in the UK.
15 October – In the United Kingdom general election, Wales elects 28 Labour MPs, six Conservatives and two Liberals.
Alan Williams becomes MP for Swansea West
Ioan Evans becomes MP for Birmingham Yardley.
Leslie Thomas, son of Labour stalwart, Jimmy Thomas, becomes Conservative MP for Canterbury.
17 October – The Welsh Office is established, under the leadership of a Secretary of State for Wales (Jim Griffiths).
27 October – Pembroke Refinery is officially opened by Queen Elizabeth II of the United Kingdom.
11 November – Politician Alun Gwynne Jones is raised to the peerage with the title Baron Chalfont of Llantarnam.
date unknown
Civic Trust for Wales formed to promote conservation and enhancement of the built environment.
Opening of the Edgar Evans building at the Royal Navy shore establishment on Whale Island, Portsmouth.

Arts and literature

Awards
Queen's Gold Medal for Poetry – R. S. Thomas
National Eisteddfod of Wales (held in Swansea)
National Eisteddfod of Wales: Chair – Bryn Williams
National Eisteddfod of Wales: Crown – Rhydwen Williams
National Eisteddfod of Wales: Prose Medal – Rhiannon Davies Jones

New books

English language
Aneirin Talfan Davies – Dylan: Druid of the Broken Body
Emrys Daniel Hughes – Sir Alec Douglas-Home
Stead Jones – Make Room for the Jester
Howard Spring – Winds of the Day
Reginald Frances Treharne – The Battle of Lewes in English History
Raymond Williams – Second Generation

Welsh language
John Gwilym Jones – Hanes Rhyw Gymro
John Robert Jones – Yr Argyfwng Gwacter Ystyr
Saunders Lewis – Merch Gwern Hywel
Caradog Prichard – Genod yn ein Bywyd
Thomas Ifor Rees – Illimani

Music
Geraint Evans stars as Falstaff at the Metropolitan Opera.

Film
Richard Burton stars in The Night of the Iguana.
Siân Phillips takes her first major film role in Becket, alongside her husband Peter O'Toole and Burton.
Victor Spinetti appears with The Beatles in A Hard Day's Night.  Alun Owen's screenplay is nominated for an Academy Award.

Broadcasting
BBC Wales is launched.

Welsh-language television
Sion a Sian (later also produced in English as Mr and Mrs)

English-language television
Wales Today

Sport
Olympic Games – Lynn Davies wins the gold medal in the men's long jump.
Rugby union
1 February – Wales defeat Scotland 11–3 in Cardiff.  Stuart Watkins makes his international debut.
7 March – Wales defeat Ireland 15–6 in Dublin.  John Dawes makes his international debut.
Wales win the Five Nations Championship.
The Welsh national side makes its first overseas tour, to South Africa.
Tennis – Gerald Battrick wins the British and French junior championships.
BBC Wales Sports Personality of the Year – Lynn Davies

Births
29 January – Anna Ryder Richardson, interior designer and television host
9 February – Dewi Morris, rugby player
4 March – Dave Colclough, poker player (died 2016
21 March – Ieuan Evans, rugby player
22 June – Neil Haddock, Welsh and British Champion super featherweight boxer
23 June – Robert Dickie, Welsh and British Champion boxing champion (died 2010)
16 August – Nigel Redman, rugby player
15 September – Steve Watkin, cricketer
8 October – Alan Knill, footballer
3 November – Wayne Mumford, footballer
28 November – Sian Williams, television presenter
30 November – Richard Brake, actor
1 December – Jo Walton, novelist and poet
31 December – Lowri Turner, television presenter
date unknown – Grahame Davies, poet

Deaths
4 January – Arthur Wade-Evans, historian, 88
7 January – Cyril Davies, harmonica player, 31
13 February – Cliff Richards, rugby player, 62
14 February
Sir Guildhaume Myrddin-Evans, civil servant, 69
William Ormsby-Gore, 4th Baron Harlech, 78
3 March – Ieuan Williams, cricketer, 54
6 August – Norman Matthews, clergyman and broadcaster, 60
14 August – Redvers Sangoe, Light-heavyweight boxer, 28
26 August – Bryn Roberts, trade union leader, 67
14 September – Fitzroy Richard Somerset, 4th Baron Raglan, anthropologist, 79
18 September – Juliet Rhys-Williams, writer and politician, 65
9 October – Thomas Jones Pierce, historian, 59
5 November – Owen Jones politician in Canada, 74
13 November – Leslie Morris, Welsh-Canadian politician, 60
14 November – Idwal Jones, novelist, 73
30 November – Sir John Cecil-Williams, lawyer and secretary of the Cymmrodorion, 72
4 December (in Melbourne) – James 'Tuan' Jones, Wales and British Lion rugby player, 81
date unknown – Idloes Owen, singer, composer, and conductor, 59

See also
1964 in Northern Ireland

References

 
Wales
 Wales